Al Awaynat or Alawinat or Serdeles is a small town located in the Sahara Desert in Libya. It lies at the entrance of the Djebel Al Akakus. It is located 240 km south west of the city of Ubari and 120 km north of the city of Ghat. Al Awaynat is the gate of Tadrart Acacus and its residents from Toureg tribe.

The name Serdeles in the Tuareg language is meaning small springs, the same meaning of the Arabic name, hence, the Arabic name is probably an Arabizing of the Tuareg name.

References

Awinat